The  is a minivan produced by the Japanese automaker Toyota since 2002. It is available as a seven or eight-seater with petrol and hybrid engine options. Hybrid variants have been available since 2003, which incorporates Toyota's Hybrid Synergy Drive technology.

The Alphard is primarily made for the Japanese market, but is also sold in Bangladesh, Belarus, Russia, the Middle East, Greater China, and Southeast Asia. Similar to the Camry, it is often classified as a luxury car in Southeast Asian markets.

Since the second generation, a twin model called  has also been available, which is marketed as a sportier alternative to the Alphard and exclusively marketed by the Netz Store dealership chain until 2020. Since 2019, a modified version of the third-generation model has been sold as the Lexus LM for several Asian markets outside Japan.

The vehicle was named after Alphard, the brightest star in the constellation Hydra. The Alphard also received a special front emblem, which depicts the lowercase alpha letter. The name "Vellfire" was derived from "velvet" and "fire" to emphasize "smooth" and "passionate" as characteristics of the vehicle.



First generation (AH10; 2002) 

The Alphard was launched by Toyota in May 2002. The Alphard V was exclusive to the Netz Store, while the Alphard G has a different grille design and was exclusive to Toyopet Store. The Alphard was facelifted in 2005 with new design of rear lamp and use of 16" and 17" aluminium alloy wheels.

In 2006, a Royal Lounge Alphard was introduced. It is a more upmarket, four-seat version of the Alphard G.

For model year 2007, on Japanese models only, G-BOOK, a subscription telematics service, was offered as an option. The Alphard is also the first Japanese market minivan to feature a laser-guided Adaptive Cruise Control, although only as an option on V6 variants.

Alphard V

Alphard G

Alphard Hybrid 

The Alphard Hybrid uses "by-wire" technology that monitors brake pedal pressure and vehicle speed in order to calculate the optimum hydraulic pressure. By-wire works with the E-Four AWD system to maximize the collection of kinetic energy from braking for conversion into electric power.

The Alphard Hybrid can generate up to 1,500 watts and is equipped with 100-volt AC power outlets, to power external appliances such as laptops and emergency lights.

In Japan, the Alphard Hybrid locally qualifies as an Ultra-Low Emissions Vehicle (ULEV), achieving emission levels 75% lower than the Japanese government's year 2000 benchmark.

Second generation (AH20; 2008) 

After being previewed as the FT-MV in 2007, the second generation Alphard went on sale in May 2008. For this generation, a twin model called the Vellfire, was introduced as the successor of Alphard V. According to Toyota's press release, the Alphard is described as having an "elegant and sophisticated" design while the Vellfire emphasizes on "strength and strong individuality." Both models are sold via separate distribution channels, with the Alphard sold by Toyota's Toyopet Store dealership chain, while the Vellfire is sold at Toyota's youth oriented Netz Store dealership chain. 

Variants of the Alphard/Vellfire include:

 2.4-litre petrol 2-wheel drive - ANH20 (Alphard/Vellfire)
 2.4-litre petrol 4-wheel drive (Toyota ATC/DTC) - ANH25 (Alphard/Vellfire)
 3.5-litre petrol 2-wheel drive - GGH20 (Alphard/Vellfire)
 3.5-litre petrol 4-wheel drive (Toyota ATC/DTC) - GGH25 (Alphard/Vellfire)
 2.4-litre hybrid 4-wheel drive (E-Four) - ATH20 (Alphard/Vellfire)

The second generation Alphard was launched in the Philippines on 3 August 2010.

Grade levels
 Alphard X/Vellfire X - Available with 2.4 and 3.5 petrol engines. Base spec model, Beige cloth interior, 7 or 8 seats, usually just one powered door, xenon headlights, many options available.
 Alphard S/Vellfire Z - Available with 2.4 and 3.5 petrol engines. Middle spec. Sportier exterior with body side mouldings and deeper front and rear bumpers. Dark grey/black cloth interior, 7 seat only with ottomans, powered doors on both sides, LED strip lighting, powered mirrors, climate control front and rear. Many special edition variants adding various option packs, usually including a powered tailgate and/or cruise control and/or part-leather trim:
 Platinum selection/Platinum Selection 2 (Vellfire Z)
 Golden Eyes/Golden Eyes2 (Vellfire Z)
 Prime/Prime 2 (Alphard S)
 Type Gold/Type Gold 2 (Alphard S)
 Alphard G/Vellfire V - Available with 2.4 and 3.5 petrol engines.  Top spec of standard range. Beige cloth interior, 7 or 8 seats, powered doors on both sides.  Cruise control standard.  Electric powered front seats with drivers memory, front passenger seat has a powered ottomon (leg rest).  Powered tailgate is an option.
 Alphard S - C Package/Vellfire Z - G Package - Available with 3.5 engine only up until November 2011. 7 seats only. Dark grey/black cloth interior only, black heated leather an option. Body style as with S/Z variants. Adds middle row captain chairs with powered ottomans and powered recline, side and tailgate doors powered, twin sunroof an option.  Premium sound system an option with factory rear monitor.
 Alphard G - L Package/Vellfire V - L Package - Available with 3.5 engine only up until November 2011. 7 seats only. Standard beige leather, upgraded middle row captain chairs also in leather with powered recline and powered ottomons.  Front seats heated.  Twin sunroofs standard. Option to have middle row seats heated and ventilated. Radar Cruise Control and Lane Keeping Assist (LKA) optional.
 Royal Lounge - Available with 3.5 engine only up until November 2011. Dealer spec option to have the rear interior to be stripped out and replaced with two luxury first class seats with a limousine-like experience for its passengers.  Approved conversions were carried out by Modellista.

Alphard

Vellfire

2011 facelift
A facelift model was announced by Toyota on 27 September 2011, with sales in Japan started from 1 November 2011. Also introduced a hybrid version of both the Alphard and Vellfire.

The hybrid version was reintroduced in November 2011 and whilst the model variants remained similar, all specs were available in all three drivetrains, 2.4/3.5/2.4 Hybrid.  The Hybrid was the later generation of THS2 with Eco Mode and EV mode.  The petrol variants also received Eco mode buttons on the dash, helping to smooth out acceleration and to improve efficiency.  Styling differences introduced across all models and interior trim colours and materials improved.  Nanoe air purifiers were available in almost all variants.

 Alphard X/Vellfire X - Spec similar to pre-facelift, available in 2.4 and 3.5 petrol and 2.4 Hybrid
 Alphard S/Vellfire Z - Available in 2.4 and 3.5 petrol with Eco mode.  2.4 Hybrid was named Alphard SR and Vellfire ZR, and had cruise control and Nanoe Air purification as standard
 Alphard G/Vellfire V - Available with 2.4 and 3.5 petrol engines with Eco mode and also with 2.4 Hybrid.
 Alphard S - C Package/Vellfire Z - G Package - Available in 2.4 and 3.5 petrol with Eco mode.  2.4 Hybrid was named Alphard SR-C and Vellfire ZR-G. As pre-facelift, but black leather interior much more common, Hybrid models slightly higher spec as standard, but many options available to all variants.
 Alphard G - L Package/Vellfire V - L Package - Available in 2.4 and 3.5 petrol with Eco mode and also the 2.4 hybrid.
  G's – Sporty edition based on Alphard S/Vellfire Z, not available for Hybrid and AWD models.
 Premium Seat Package - Premium seat package added heated and cooled middle row captain chairs.  In effect this package put all options onto the G and SR/ZR variants, making them the highest spec 7 seaters available, including the twin sunroofs.
 Royal Lounge - The Modellista conversion now available on the Hybrid as from November 2011 this was seen as the highest spec drivetrain.  Also available on the 3.5 petrol.

Alphard

Vellfire

Safety
JNCAP has rated the Alphard a full six stars for occupant crash safety and outstanding safety features. Safety features such as Anti-lock Braking System, Electronic Brakeforce Distribution, Brake Assist, Vehicle Stability Control and seven airbags (Dual front, Driver and passenger side airbags, Driver's knee and curtain airbags) are standard across all variants. Higher end variants offer a first-in-class Pre-Crash system as an option (only for Japanese models). Features include a radar-guided Adaptive Cruise Control, Lane Departure Warning with Lane Keep Assist and Pre-collision Warning with Semi-Autonomous Emergency Braking, which only helps apply a moderate amount of brake pressure, and does not completely stop the vehicle.

Third generation (AH30; 2015) 

Toyota released the third generation Alphard on 26 January 2015 with a completely redesigned exterior and 2 new engines, including a 2.5-litre 2AR-FE petrol engine and a 2.5-litre 2AR-FXE petrol-hybrid engine. The 3.5-litre 2GR-FE V6 along with the 6-speed automatic was carried over from the previous generation. A new top-of-the-line Executive Lounge grade was added for both the Alphard and Vellfire.

The third generation features a large grille similar to the S210 series Crown and its tail lights are located on top similar to the third generation Estima/Previa and second generation Sienna. The Alphard faces competition from other minivans such as the Nissan Elgrand and the fifth generation international market Honda Odyssey. Large audio manufacturers like Alpine Electronics and JBL, also manufacture navigation and audio/visual accessories specifically for the Alphard. The Alphard can be optioned with a 1200W 17-speaker, 5.1 channel JBL sound system.

The third-generation Alphard is available in Japan and selected Asian markets including Brunei, Indonesia, Thailand, Malaysia, Singapore, the Philippines and Hong Kong, being the first markets outside Japan to receive this all-new model. The third-generation Alphard was introduced in Russia, the model's primary, and only European market, but only with the 3.5-litre V6 engine. The V6 model is also available in other left-hand drive markets, like China and Taiwan. In India, the Vellfire was offered since February 2020 as the brand's only import model in the country with the 2.5-litre hybrid engine with four-wheel drive.

Alphard

Vellfire

2018 facelift
The facelifted third generation Alphard and second generation Vellfire were unveiled on 25 December 2017 and released on 8 January 2018. Most of the changes are only to the exterior and powertrain, whereas interior equipment remains largely similar with minor changes. New rectangular taillights replace the horizontal  ones on the Vellfire, mimicking the design of the second generation's taillights. The Alphard gets slimmer LED headlights and a larger grille up front. Both models get sequential LED turn signals as standard. Also new is an updated V6 engine, the 2GR-FKS that replaces the outgoing 2GR-FE (except for Hong Kong, due to the emission rules). Also new is a Direct-Shift 8-speed automatic, that replaces the 6-speed Super ECT that is only found in V6-powered variants. Accelerating from  can be achieved in 7.5 seconds. The debut of the second generation Toyota Safety Sense system is launched with the facelifted Alphard and Vellfire, which became standard equipment across all variants.

On 1 May 2020, the Alphard and Vellfire became available at all Toyota dealership sales channels in Japan (Toyota Store, Toyopet Store, Corolla Store and Netz), and the Netz logo emblem on the Vellfire's front grille was replaced by the Toyota logo emblem.

In April 2021, trim levels for the Vellfire in Japan were reduced to one special edition trim, Golden Eyes II, due to decreasing sales as the result of the dealership line-up unification in 2020.

In the same month, the Vellfire in China was renamed to Toyota Crown Vellfire, with the inclusion of the Crown logo replacing the front Toyota logo, and in other places such as the hubcaps and instrument cluster.

Alphard

Vellfire

Crown Vellfire

Lexus LM 
The Lexus-badged limousine version of the third generation Alphard, called the Lexus LM, was unveiled on 16 April 2019 at the 18th Shanghai International Automobile Industry Exhibition and first released on 20 February 2020 in China. The LM designation stands for "Luxury Mover". The LM features newer and stronger structural components, along with additional soundproofing elements such as dual-pane windows. There are two seating configurations, a 7-seater configuration that is based on the Alphard Executive Lounge variant, and a 4-seater configuration named the "Emperor Suite", based on the Alphard Royal Lounge variant. The LM features a new suspension setup featuring Swing Valve technology.

Two engine options are available, a 2.5-litre 2AR-FXE hybrid four-cylinder in the LM 300h, and the 3.5-litre 2GR-FKS V6 in the LM 350 (2GR-FE for the Hong Kong market).

Sales

References

External links 

  (Alphard)
  (Vellfire)
  (Lexus LM)

Alphard
Cars introduced in 2002
2010s cars
2020s cars
Minivans
Full-size vehicles
Front-wheel-drive vehicles
All-wheel-drive vehicles
Vehicles with CVT transmission
Hybrid minivans
Partial zero-emissions vehicles